Good Health is the first studio album by Pretty Girls Make Graves. Originally released in 2002 by Lookout Records, it was re-released by Matador Records with an additional 4 songs made up of the band's first self-titled EP. This album is often mistakenly referred to as Is It Broken, Doctor? on some internet discussion boards and file-sharing services due to the inclusion of that phrase on the cover of the album, on which the actual title is not present.

Track listing

Personnel
 Andrea Zollo – Vocals
 Nick Dewitt – Drums, Vocals, Samples, Keyboards
 Derek Fudesco – Bass, Vocals
 J. Clark – Guitar, Vocals, Programming, Keyboards
 Nathan Thelen – Guitar, Vocals

References

2002 debut albums
Pretty Girls Make Graves albums
Lookout! Records albums
Matador Records albums
Albums produced by Phil Ek
Albums recorded at Robert Lang Studios